Najas kurziana, called the Bihar water nymph, is an aquatic plant growing in fresh water ponds. It is a rare and little-known species known from East Timor and from the State of Bihar in India.  The species was initially discovered between Kishenganj and Oolabena, near the border with Nepal.

References

kurziana
Freshwater plants
Flora of India (region)
Flora of East Timor
Plants described in 1899